Antenna ( antennas or antennae) may refer to:

Science and engineering

Biology
 Antenna (biology), one of one or more pairs of appendages used for sensing in arthropods
 Antenna (journal), the journal of the Royal Entomological Society

Other uses in science and engineering
 Antenna (radio), also known as an aerial, a transducer designed to transmit or receive electromagnetic (e.g., TV or radio) waves
 Antennae Galaxies, the name of two colliding galaxies NGC 4038 and NGC 4039

Media

Broadcast channels and stations
 ANT1, a Greek-language terrestrial channel
 Antena Internațional, a Romanian television channel
 Antena 1 (Romania), a Romanian television channel
 Antena 2 (Romania), a Romanian television channel
 Antena 3 (Romania), a Romanian television channel
 Antena 3 (Spain), a Spanish terrestrial television channel
 Antenna TV, a U.S. television channel established in 2011 by Tribune Broadcasting
 RDP Antena 1, Portuguese public radio station
 RDP Antena 2, Portuguese public radio station
 RDP Antena 3, Portuguese public radio station
 Antena Radio Jelah, Bosnian commercial radio station from Tešanj
 Antena Sarajevo, Bosnian commercial radio station from Sarajevo
 Radio Antena M, Montenegrin commercial radio station from Podgorica

Film and television
 "Antenna", an episode of the Adult Swim animated television series, Aqua Teen Hunger Force
 Antenna (film), a satirical 1969 Dutch film directed by Adriaan Ditvoorst
 Antenna Documentary Film Festival, an international film festival held in Sydney, Australia
 Antenna Awards, an annual awards ceremony for television programs broadcast on Australia's Channel 31 stations

Music

Albums
 Antennae (album), a 1997 album by jazz guitarist Joe Morris
 Antenna (Cave In album), 2003
 Antenna (GO!GO!7188 album), 2009
 Antenna (ZZ Top album), 1994

Songs
 "Antenna" (song), a 2013 song released by Fuse ODG
 "Antenna", a single by The Church from Starfish
 "Antenna", a song by Kraftwerk from Radio-Activity
 "Antenna", a single by Sonic Youth band from The Eternal
 "Antenna", a song released by Bonobo on the album The North Borders

Other uses in music
 Antenna (band), an American indie rock band
 Antena, a French-Belgian synth pop band, led by Isabelle Antena (a pseudonym for Isabelle Powaga)
 Antenna (record label), a South Korean record label

Other media
 Antenna (magazine), a web publication owned by Townsquare Media, formerly a print magazine

See also
 Aerial (disambiguation)
 Antenna array